Remembrance Days is the second album by the British band The Dream Academy. Not as successful as the band's 1985 self-titled debut, the album peaked at number 181 in the United States.

The lyrics and music for "The Lesson of Love" was written in just two four-hour sessions at Patrick Leonard's home.

Nick was inspired to write "In Exile" after reading an article in The Village Voice on Rodrigo Rojas.

"Everybody's Got to Learn Sometime" was not to be included in the album at first, until Lindsey Buckingham got involved with it at the last minute. Because of this, the vocals were done in his bedroom as he played the snare drum in his bathroom.

The instrumental version of "Power To Believe" appeared in the 1987 film Planes, Trains, and Automobiles, however the film's official soundtrack album contained the full vocal version.  The instrumental version was finally included on the band's 2014 Greatest Hits compilation The Morning Lasted All Day: A Retrospective.

Track listing

Singles
 "Indian Summer"
 "The Lesson of Love"
 "Power to Believe" 
 "Everybody's Gotta Learn Sometime" (Canada)

References

1987 albums
Albums produced by Hugh Padgham
Albums produced by Patrick Leonard
Albums produced by Richard Dashut
Albums produced by Lindsey Buckingham
Blanco y Negro Records albums
The Dream Academy albums